NGC 1452 (or NGC 1455) is a barred lenticular galaxy in the constellation Eridanus. Located 80 million light years away, it is one of the farther galaxies of the Eridanus cluster, a cluster of approximately 200 galaxies. It was discovered on October 6, 1785 by William Herschel.
 
The galaxy has a Hubble classification of SB0-a, indicating it is a lenticular galaxy with a bar. NGC 1452's bar extends from the core to the middle of the galaxy. It size on the night sky is 2.8' x 1.5' which is proportional to the real size of 65,000 light-years.

The galaxy is a member of the NGC 1407 Group, a small group of the galaxies inside the Eridanus Cluster, together with the galaxies NGC 1407, NGC 1400 and others.

See also 
NGC 1407, brightest member of NGC 1407 Group
NGC 1460, another barred lenticular galaxy, with huge bar
Lenticular galaxy

References

External links 
 

Eridanus (constellation)
Barred lenticular galaxies
Discoveries by William Herschel
Galaxies discovered in 1785
1452
013765